Jakub Zejglic (born May 18, 1990) is a Polish footballer who plays for German club Blomberger SV.

External links 
 

1990 births
Living people
Polish footballers
Polish expatriate footballers
Lechia Gdańsk players
Bałtyk Gdynia players
Bytovia Bytów players
Gwardia Koszalin players
People from Sławno
Sportspeople from West Pomeranian Voivodeship
Association football forwards
Polish expatriate sportspeople in Germany
Expatriate footballers in Germany